Musketier Oskar Niemeyer (n.d. – 23 August 1914) was a German soldier. He is recognized as the first recipient (posthumous) of the Iron Cross during the First World War.

Biography

Niemeyer was from Hildesheim. He joined the 84th Infantry Regiment as a recruit in the autumn of 1913, having previously been a gardener. On 23 August 1914, during the Battle of Mons, the 84th Infantry Regiment came upon resistance and closed swing bridge Mons–Condé canal while seeking to extend their position into the east side of the canal. Niemeyer swam across the canal, returned across the canal with a requisitioned small boat, paddled back across the canal with a team who took up position in a house and managed to open fire on the British from there. Meanwhile, Niemeyer opened the bridge allowing the Germans troops to cross in greater numbers. He was killed shortly after opening the bridge. Niemeyer is buried in St Symphorien Military Cemetery in Plot G1 row R grave 6.

References

1914 deaths
People from Hildesheim
German military personnel killed in World War I
Recipients of the Iron Cross (1914)
Burials at St Symphorien Military Cemetery
Military personnel from Lower Saxony
German Army personnel of World War I